Gazeuse! (French for 'Sparkling!', 'Fizzy!' or 'Effervescent!') is the seventh album released under the name Gong and the de facto debut album by Pierre Moerlen's Gong. It was released in late 1976. The title was changed to Expresso for the U.S. release.

The album features an all-instrumental jazz-driven sound, notable for the prominent use of vibraphone, and has little to do with the psychedelic space rock of Daevid Allen's Gong, even though the two bands share a common history. Although the album was issued by Virgin Records under the "Gong" name for contractual reasons, and the name "Pierre Moerlen's Gong" would not be adopted for a couple of years, the lineup involved and the nature of the music are that of the Moerlen-led band.

Writing credits are split between Moerlen and guitarist Allan Holdsworth, except for the final track, which is by early Magma and Flying Teapot bassist Francis Moze.

Track listing
Side one
"Expresso" (Pierre Moerlen) – 5:58
"Night Illusion" (Allan Holdsworth) – 3:42
"Percolations (Part I & II)" (Moerlen) – 10:00
Side two
<li>"Shadows Of" (Holdsworth) – 7:48
<li>"Esnuria" (Moerlen) – 8:00
<li>"Mireille" (Francis Moze) – 4:10

"Shadows Of" is a reworking of Allan Holdsworth's "Velvet Darkness" from his 1976 album of the same name.

Personnel
Pierre Moerlen's Gong
Pierre Moerlen – drums, vibraphone, marimba, timpani, glockenspiel
Didier Malherbe – tenor sax (1,5), flute (4)
Allan Holdsworth – guitars, violin, pedal steel
Mireille Bauer – vibraphone, marimba, glockenspiel, toms
Benoît Moerlen – vibraphone
Francis Moze – fretless bass, gong, piano
Mino Cinelu – percussion

References

Macan, E. L., Macan, E. (1997). Rocking the Classics: English Progressive Rock and the Counterculture. Germany: Oxford University Press. p. 243

1976 albums
Gong (band) albums
Pierre Moerlen's Gong albums
Virgin Records albums